William Kent Brewster (November 8, 1941 – October 3, 2022) was an American pharmacist and politician.

Early life
Brewster was born in Ardmore, Oklahoma, on November 8, 1941, the son of Grady Omar and Rachel Mayo Brewster. He attended public schools, graduating from Petrolia High School in Petrolia, Texas, and earned his Bachelor of Science in pharmacy from Southwestern Oklahoma State University in 1968. He was initiated into Tau Kappa Epsilon, and was a member of the United States Army Reserves from 1966 to 1971.

After college graduation, Brewster moved to Colleyville, Texas, where, as a licensed pharmacist, he owned and operated Colleyville Drug. In 1968, he also began a career as a cattleman and rancher when he started Brewster Angus Farms, as well as owning a real estate business. In 1977, Brewster settled in Marietta, Oklahoma.

Entry into politics
In 1982, Brewster was elected to a seat in the Oklahoma House of Representatives for District 49. He was re-elected in 1984 and served until 1990.  

In the 1990 elections, Brewster ran for an open seat in the U.S. House of Representatives (District 3—then Congressman Wes Watkins had decided to retire from Congress and run for Governor of Oklahoma). Brewster won the heavily contested Democratic party nomination against Lieutenant Governor Robert S. Kerr III. He won the election to Congress in November 1990 in this heavily Democratic district (referred to as "Little Dixie"). He was re-elected in 1992 and then again in 1994, serving from January 3, 1991, to January 3, 1997.

Retirement from Congress
In December 1995, Brewster announced that he would not run for reelection to Congress in 1996. He was mentioned as a possible Democratic candidate for governor in 1998, but declined to run for the nomination.

After he left Congress, Brewster joined R. Duffy Wall and Associates, a Washington, D.C., lobbying firm. In 2001, he served as president and chief operating officer of this firm. He was also chief executive officer and chairman of the Capitol Hill Consulting Group.

Personal life
Brewster married Mary Sue "Suzie" Nelson in 1963, and the couple had three children: Balynda Karel, Betsy Kecia, and Bradley Kent. On January 31, 1990, Betsy Kecia and Bradley Kent died in a plane crash with friends of the family.

Brewster died on October 3, 2022, at the age of 80. He died at his home in Marietta following a battle with cancer.

References

External links
 Encyclopedia of Oklahoma History and Culture – Brewster, Bill
 
 
William K. Brewster Collection at the Carl Albert Center

1941 births
2022 deaths
American pharmacists
Democratic Party members of the United States House of Representatives from Oklahoma
20th-century Members of the Oklahoma House of Representatives
Democratic Party members of the Oklahoma House of Representatives
Military personnel from Oklahoma
People from Ardmore, Oklahoma
People from Colleyville, Texas
People from Marietta, Oklahoma
Ranchers from Oklahoma
Southwestern Oklahoma State University alumni
United States Army soldiers
Members of Congress who became lobbyists